Edmund August Friedrich Russow (– ) was a Baltic German biologist.

Academic career 
Son of a military engineer, Edmund Russow studied at the Universities of Dorpat (now Tartu, Tartu County, Estonia) and Berlin. In 1867 he became an associate professor at Dorpat, where from 1874 to 1897, he served as a full professor. In 1895-97 he was president of the Estonian Naturalists' Society. Russow was at the forefront of nature conservation in Estonia, and associated with the work of Hugo Conwentz (1865-1922), a founder of nature conservation efforts throughout Europe.

Botanical work 
Russow was an authority on Sphagnaceae (sphagnum mosses) and remembered for his research in plant anatomy and histology, in particular studies of the plant family Marsileaceae (aquatic and semi-aquatic ferns). The plant genus Russowia is named in his honor, as is Sphagnum russowii (Russow's sphagnum).

Written works 
  Histologie und Entwicklungsgeschichte der Sporenfrucht von Marsilia. Dissertation. Dorpat (1871)
 Entwickelungsgeschichte der Sporenfrucht von Marsilia (1873). In: Mémoires de l'Académie Impériale des Sciences de Saint-Pétersbourg, série VII, tome XIX, p. 42
 Vergleichende Untersuchungen betreffend die Histiologie … der leitbundel Kryptogamen. In: Mémoires de l'Académie Impériale des Sciences de St.-Pétersbourg, 1872
 Betrachtungen über das leitbundel- und grundgewebe aus vergleichend morphologischem und phylogenetischem geschichtspunkt (1875).

References 

 "Biographical information based on an equivalent article at the Estonian Wikipedia".

External links
 

1841 births
1897 deaths
People from Tallinn
People from the Governorate of Estonia
Baltic-German people
19th-century German botanists
Academic staff of the University of Tartu
Burials at Raadi cemetery